The Jersey City A's were a minor league baseball team based in Jersey City, New Jersey which played in the Eastern League for the 1978 season and was the AA affiliate of the Oakland Athletics.

History
The team changed their name from the Jersey City Indians after being affiliated with the Cleveland Indians the previous year. After the team's home, Roosevelt Stadium, suffered damage in a winter storm (two light stanchions were toppled and not repaired), the team moved to Waterbury, Connecticut for the 1979 season and became the Waterbury A's. This marked the end of professional baseball in Jersey City, with the stadium being torn down in 1985 for residential development. One notable player on the 1978 A's team was Baseball Hall of Fame member Rickey Henderson. Henderson reportedly called the stadium "a dump" and that "it should have been blown up" (it would indeed be demolished a few years later). The team's franchise was acquired in 1979 and used to revive the Buffalo Bisons, a team from the early days of baseball had sat dormant for the previous nine years.

Seasons

Roster

 Mike Norris RHP
 Darrell Woodard 2B
 Rickey Henderson LF
 Rick Lysander RHP

See also
Jersey City Skeeters
Jersey City Giants
Jersey City Jerseys
Jersey City Indians

References
The Hudson Reporter: Jersey City's Baseball History

Defunct Eastern League (1938–present) teams
Oakland Athletics minor league affiliates
Sports in Hudson County, New Jersey
Professional baseball teams in New Jersey
Defunct baseball teams in New Jersey
Baseball teams disestablished in 1978
Baseball teams established in 1978